Hagmann is a German surname. Notable people with the surname include:

Fritz Hagmann (1901–1974), Swiss sport wrestler
John S. Hagmann, American architect
Lieutenant Colonel John S. Hagmann, controversial U.S. Army Medical Corps physician who was stripped of his license
Marcel Hagmann (born 1983), German footballer

See also
Hagman

German-language surnames